Athleta boswellae is a species of sea snail, a marine gastropod mollusk in the family Volutidae, the volutes.

Description

Distribution

References

 Aiken R.P. (2010) Volutidae. pp. 314–333, in: Marais A.P. & Seccombe A.D. (eds), Identification guide to the seashells of South Africa. Volume 1. Groenkloof: Centre for Molluscan Studies. 376 pp

External links

Volutidae
Gastropods described in 1969